Carl Schwarzen (born August 29, 1943) is a retired American soccer midfielder who played professionally for one season in the National Professional Soccer League.

In 1961, Schwarzen graduated from Bishop DuBourg High School. He is a member of the school's Athletic Hall of Fame. Schwarzen attended Quincy University, where he was a 1966 Honorable Mention (third team) All-American soccer player. That year, Quincy won the NAIA national men's soccer championship. In 2006, Schwarzen, along with the entire 1966 Quincy soccer team was inducted into the university's Athletic Hall of Fame.

In 1967, Schwarzen became one of three native-born Americans to play in the newly established National Professional Soccer League when he signed with the St. Louis Stars. In 2016, Schwarzen was inducted into the St. Louis Soccer Hall of Fame.

References

External links
 NASL stats

Living people
American soccer players
National Professional Soccer League (1967) players
Quincy Hawks men's soccer players
St. Louis Stars (soccer) players
Association football midfielders
1943 births